Flatville is an unincorporated community in Compromise Township, Champaign County, Illinois, United States.

Geography

References

Unincorporated communities in Champaign County, Illinois
Unincorporated communities in Illinois